Reda Slim (born 25 October 25 1999) is a Moroccan professional footballer who plays as a forward for Botola club AS FAR.

Career
As youth product of the FAR Rabat he made his debut in the Moroccan league 2019–2020, soon earning a first Man of the match award in the capital's derby against FUS Rabat, won 4-2 by the royal army club.

But as Selim was becoming a regular player of the first team, a shoulder injury kept him out of the field for 2 months, slowing his rapid progression.

Career statistics

International

References

External links
 

Living people
2001 births
Moroccan footballers
Association football forwards
AS FAR (football) players
Botola players
2020 African Nations Championship players
Morocco A' international footballers